Anil Kant is an Indian Police Service (I.P.S.) officer. He is the State Police Chief and Director General of Police (DGP) of the Kerala State Police. He was the former Road Safety Commissioner in Kerala. He is the first Dalit officer on the chief post in the police department of Kerala. Kant is from Delhi.

Education 
Kant holds a Master's degree in Political science.

Personal life 
Kant is married to Preeta Harit and has a son Rahul.He is son of Late Rumal Singh and Sankuntala.

Career 
Kant is a 1988 batch IPS officer. He started his career in the Kerala cadre as an assistant superintendent in Kalpetta, in Wayanad district. He also served in Thiruvananthapuram rural and Railway in the same position. Provided distinguished services as Kochi City Commissioner and SP in Malappuram, Ernakulam, as also served in State Crime Branch and Special Branch as IG.

He also served as the chief of Vigilance and Anti-Corruption Bureau, Prisons and Correctional Services and Fire Force.

Prior to being appointed as the DGP of the Kerala Police, he served as Road Safety Commissioner. He was chosen by Pinarayi Vijayan, the Chief Minister of Kerala, after a cabinet meeting.

Awards 
Kant was awarded the President's Police Medal for meritorious services and also received Badge of Honour in 2018 for the successful conduct of All India Police Games.

References

Living people
Indian Police Service officers
Year of birth missing (living people)